Cheer Up and Smile is a 1930 American pre-Code musical film directed by Sidney Lanfield. The film starred Arthur Lake, Dixie Lee and Olga Baclanova and a 23-year-old John Wayne had a minor uncredited role.

Plot

Cast
Arthur Lake as Eddie Fripp 
Dixie Lee as Margie 
Olga Baclanova as Yvonne 
"Whispering" Jack Smith as himself 
Johnny Arthur as Andy 
Charles Judels as Pierre 
John Darrow as Tom 
Sumner Getchell as Paul 
Franklin Pangborn as Professor
Buddy Messinger as Donald

Production notes
The role played by Arthur Lake had originally been written for "Whispering" Jack Smith.

See also
 List of American films of 1930

References

External links

1930 films
1930 musical films
Fox Film films
American musical films
American black-and-white films
Films directed by Sidney Lanfield
1930 directorial debut films
1930s English-language films
1930s American films